Massalia, minor planet designation 20 Massalia, is a stony asteroid and the parent body of the Massalia family located in the inner region of the asteroid belt, approximately  in diameter. Discovered by Italian astronomer Annibale de Gasparis on 19 September 1852, it was named for the French city of Marseille, from which the independent discover Jean Chacornac sighted it the following night.

Classification and orbit 
Massalia is the namesake and the parent body of the Massalia family, a very large inner belt asteroid family consisting of stony asteroids with very low inclinations. It is by far the largest body in this family. The remaining family members are fragments ejected by a cratering event on Massalia.

It orbits the Sun in the inner main-belt at a distance of 2.1–2.8 AU once every 3 years and 9 months (1,366 days; semi-major axis of 2.41 AU). Its orbit has an eccentricity of 0.14 and an inclination of 1° with respect to the ecliptic.

Physical characteristics 
Massalia has an above-average density for S-type asteroids, similar to the density of silicate rocks. As such, it appears to be a solid un-fractured body, a rarity among asteroids of its size. Apart from the few largest bodies over 400 km in diameter, such as 1 Ceres and 4 Vesta, most asteroids appear to have been significantly fractured, or are even rubble piles. In 1998, Bange estimated Massalia to have a mass of 5.2 kg assuming that 4 Vesta has 1.35 solar mass. The mass of Massalia is dependent on the mass of 4 Vesta and perturbation of 44 Nysa.

Lightcurve analysis indicates that Massalia's pole points towards either ecliptic coordinates (β, λ) = (45°, 10°) or (β, λ) = (45°, 190°) with a 10° uncertainty. This gives an axial tilt of 45°in both cases. The shape reconstruction from lightcurves has been described as quite spherical with large planar, nonconvex parts of the surface.

In 1988 a search for satellites or dust orbiting this asteroid was performed using the UH88 telescope at the Mauna Kea Observatories, but the effort came up empty.

Discovery 
Massalia was discovered on 19 September 1852, by Annibale de Gasparis at Naples Observatory in Italy, and also found independently the next night by Jean Chacornac at Marseilles Observatory, France. It was Chacornac's discovery that was announced first. In the nineteenth century the variant spelling Massilia was often used. Asteroids discovered prior to Massalia were assigned iconic symbols, like the ones traditionally used to designate the planets. However, astronomers had begun to phase out this practice with the discovery of 16 Psyche in March 1852, and 20 Massalia (being the first object in the Solar System with a non-mythological name) was the first asteroid that was not assigned an iconic symbol.

References

External links 
 
 Elements and Ephemeris for (20) Massalia from the Minor Planet Center
 
 

Massalia asteroids
Massalia
Massalia
S-type asteroids (Tholen)
S-type asteroids (SMASS)
18520919